The Heinkel HD 32 was a trainer developed in Germany in the 1920s, a derivative of the HD 21. Like that aircraft, it was a conventional, single-bay biplane, but had only two cockpits rather than the three that the HD 21 had. The other significant change was the use of a Siemens radial engine in place of the inline units that powered most of the HD 21 family.

A number of HD 32s participated in the 1925 Deutscher Rundflug, including one powered by a Bristol Lucifer engine.

Specifications (variant)

References

 

1920s German military trainer aircraft
HD 32
Aircraft first flown in 1926